A spider is a type of arthropod.

Spider, Spiders or The Spider may also refer to:

Arts, entertainment and media

Fictional entities
Spider (DC Comics), a character introduced in 1940
Spider (pulp fiction), a 1933–1943 pulp magazine hero
Phantom Troupe, also known as the Spiders, characters in the Hunter × Hunter manga series
Spider, a character in Mega Man X: Command Mission
Spider, a cartoon character in Osamu Tezuka's Star System
Spider Jerusalem, the protagonist of the comic book Transmetropolitan
Spiderlegs, a ghost in an episode of The Real Ghostbusters
The Spider (British comics), a 1965–1969 British comic book character, later reprinted in Vulcan
 The Spider, the eunuch Varys in George R.R. Martin's A Song of Ice and Fire and its TV adaptation, Game of Thrones

Films 

The Spider (1916 film), by Robert G. Vignola
The Spiders (film), 1919, by Fritz Lang
The Spider (1931 film), by MacKenna and  Menzies
The Spider (1940 film), by Maurice Elvey
The Spider (1945 film), by Robert D. Webb
Spider (2002 film), by David Cronenberg
Spider (2007 film), by Nash Edgerton
Spiders 3D, 2013, by Tibor Takács
The Spider, or Earth vs. the Spider
The Spider, 2012 film by Robert Sigl
Spider (2019 film), Chile

Gaming 
Spider (solitaire), a card game
Spiders (company), a French video game developer
Spiders (video game), a 1981 arcade game
Spider: The Secret of Bryce Manor, a 2009 iPhone game
Spider: The Video Game, a 1997 video game developed by Boss Game Studios

Literature
Spider (novel), a 1990 novel by Patrick McGrath
Al-Ankabut ("The Spider"), the 29th sura of the Qur'an

Music

Groups
Spider (American band), a 1980s American rock band
Spider (British band), a UK rock band formed in 1976
Spiders (British band), a 2010s British indie band
Spiders (Swedish band), a 2010s Swedish rock band
The Spiders (American band), a 1950s R&B group
The Spiders (American rock band), a 1960s American rock band, later known as Alice Cooper
The Spiders (Japanese band), a 1960s Japanese Group Sounds band

Albums
Spiders (album), a 1996 album by Space

Songs
"Spider", a song by Bo Burnham from the 2022 The Inside Outtakes
"Spider", a song by Oingo Boingo on the 1994 album Boingo
"Spider", a single by Spitz
"Spider", a song by The Vapors on the 1981 album Magnets
"Spider", a song by They Might Be Giants on the 1992 album Apollo 18
"Spiders" (Destine song), 2010
"Spiders" (Moby song), 2005
"Spiders" (System of a Down song), 1999
"Spiders", a song by Slipknot on the 2019 album We Are Not Your Kind
"Spiders", a song by Editors on the 2007 album An End Has a Start
"Spiders (Kidsmoke)", a song by Wilco on the 2004 album A Ghost Is Born
"The Spider", a song by Kansas on the 1997 album Point of Know Return
"The Spider", a song by Scottish musician Momus on the 2015 album Turpsycore

Periodicals
Spider (computer magazine), a monthly magazine in Karachi, Pakistan
Spider (magazine), a children's literary magazine
The Spider (magazine), a pulp magazine published from 1933 to 1943

Other uses in arts, entertainment and media
Spider (Bourgeois), a sculpture by Louise Bourgeois
Spider! (TV series), a 1991 musical children's television mini series
The Spiders (comic), a webcomic by Patrick S. Farley
"Spider", a 2005 episode of the animated television series 12 oz. Mouse

Military
4th Guards Brigade "Spiders", a former Croatian army unit
Light Strike Vehicle (Singapore), or Spider New Generation
SS-23 Spider, a ballistic missile

People
Spider (nickname), a list of people
John Koerner (born 1938), American blues/folk musician known as Spider
Spider Robinson (born 1948), American-Canadian science-fiction writer
The Spider, ring name for professional wrestler Randy Savage (1952–2011)
The Spider, professional wrestler from United States Wrestling Association

Places
Spider, Kentucky, U.S.
Spider crater, Western Australia
"The Spider", another name for the Pantheon Fossae surface formation on Mercury

Science and technology
Spider (polarimeter), an experiment to study the cosmic microwave background radiation
Spider, the callsign of the Apollo 9 lunar module
Spider, a support for the secondary mirror of a reflecting telescope
Spider, a component of a loudspeaker
AMD Spider, a computer platform
45 rpm adapter, called the spider, for a phonograph record
Web spider, another name for a an Internet bot that systematically browses the World Wide Web for purposes of web typically employed by search engines 
Spectral phase interferometry for direct electric-field reconstruction, an ultrashort pulse measurement technique
Spider wrench, a x-shaped Lug wrench
Tubing spider, a heavy duty gripping tool used in oil drilling for securing the drill pipe to the drill floor
SPIDER, a prototype negative ion source for the ITER Heating Neutral Beams
Spider arm, a weak spot of front-loading washing machines

Sports
Spider, a piece of snooker equipment
Cleveland Spiders, an 1887–1899 American baseball team
Richmond Spiders, the sports teams of the University of Richmond
San Francisco Spiders, a 1996 American hockey team
The Spiders, an early ring name for professional wrestling tag-team The Headbangers
The Spiders, nickname of Queen's Park F.C., Glasgow

Transportation
 Spider (locomotive), a 1890 locomotive on the Marrawah Tramway, Tasmania, Australia
 Spider, part of a bicycle crankset
 Alfa Romeo Brera and Spider, launched in 2006
 Alfa Romeo GTV and Spider, launched in 1995
 Alfa Romeo Spider, a sports car introduced in 1966
 Aston Martin Valkyrie Spider, a convertible version of the Aston Martin Valkyrie sports car
 Fiat 124 Sport Spider, a sports car produced 1966–1980
 Fiat 124 Spider (2016), a sports car introduced in 2016
 McLaren MP4-12C Spider, a convertible version of the McLaren MP4-12C sports car
 Pipistrel Spider, a Slovenian ultralight trike aircraft design
 Renault Sport Spider, a sports car produced 1996–1999

Other uses
Spider (portal) (Strathclyde Personal Interactive Development and Educational Resource)
SPDR, pronounced "spider", a family of investment funds
Spider (utensil), a basket with a long handle
Spider, a type of frying pan with legs
Spider, a type of ice cream float (a beverage)

See also

SPDR (disambiguation)
Spyder (disambiguation)